Sekh is a rural locality (a selo) in Tlogobsky Selsoviet, Gunibsky District, Republic of Dagestan, Russia. The population was 288 as of 2010.

Geography 
Sekh is located 44 km northwest of Gunib (the district's administrative centre) by road, on the Kudiyabor River. Rosutl and Ala are the nearest rural localities.

Nationalities 
Avars live there.

References 

Rural localities in Gunibsky District